Anna Slunga-Tallberg (born 5 February 1962) is a Finnish sailor. She competed in the women's 470 event at the 1992 Summer Olympics.

References

External links
 

1962 births
Living people
Finnish female sailors (sport)
Olympic sailors of Finland
Sailors at the 1992 Summer Olympics – 470
Sportspeople from Helsinki